Robert "Bob" Lumsden was an Indian footballer, who played for the India national football team as a striker.

Football career
He was India's first ever hat-trick scorer. He scored it against Australia national football team during a friendly match on 24 September 1938. His hat-trick includes a penalty at the 46th minutes.

Lumsden scored eight official goals for India from five international friendly matches against Australia during the Australia tour, considered as first ever international tour of the national side. He also scored two more hat-tricks and a total of 10 goals from 11 matches during that tour from some friendly matches against clubs and Australian state teams.

International statistics
Scores and results list India's goal tally first.

 † indicates that the goal was scored through penalty kick.

See also
 List of India national football team hat-tricks
 History of the India national football team

References

Bibliography

Dutta, P. L., Memoir of 'Father of Indian Football' Nagendraprasad Sarbadhikary (Calcutta: N. P. Sarbadhikary Memorial Committee, 1944) (hereafter Memoir)

From recreation to competition: Early history of Indian football . pp. 124–141. Published online: 6 Aug 2006. www.tandfonline.com. Retrieved 30 June 2021.

External links
 

Year of death missing
Indian footballers
India international footballers
Association football forwards